Rochan (also Romanized as Rochān; also known as Rojān, Roochoon Olya, Roochoon Sofla, Rūjūn, and Rūtshūn) is a village in Khabar Rural District, in the Central District of Baft County, Kerman Province, Iran. At the 2006 census, its population was 73, in 29 families.

References 

Populated places in Baft County